Teniski klub Partizan is a tennis club from Belgrade, Serbia. The club is part of the sports society JSD Partizan.

History

Notable players

Men
  Novak Djokovic
  Janko Tipsarević
  Nenad Zimonjić
  Dušan Lajović
  Filip Krajinović
  Miomir Kecmanović
  Marko Tepavac
  Dušan Vemić
  Ilija Bozoljac
  Nikola Mektić
  Goran Tošić
  Nikola Čačić
  Darko Mađarovski
  Alex Vlaški
  Vladimir Obradović
  Arsenije Zlatanović
  Srđan Muškatirović
  Nikola Špear
  Radmilo Armenulić
  Ivko Plećević
  Sima Nikolic
  Ika Panajotovic
  Bojan Zdravkovic

Women
  Ana Ivanovic
  Andrea Petkovic
  Bojana Jovanovski
  Jelena Dokic
  Marija Mirkovic
  Dea Herdželaš
  Olga Danilović
  Milana Spremo
  Andrea Popović
  Ana Jovanović
  Teodora Mirčić
  Tamara Čurović
  Nataša Zorić
  Vojislava Lukić
  Ana-Maria Zubori
  Dragana Zarić
  Katarina Mišić
  Dora Alavantić
  Sonja Požeg
  Biljana Kostić
  Jelena Genčić
  Dragica Laslo

Honours

Men
National championships
Winners (20) :  1952, 1953, 1956, 1957, 1958, 1959, 1961, 1985, 1986, 1989, 1992, 1993, 1994, 1995, 1996, 1997, 2001, 2003, 2005, 2007

Women
National championships
Winners (11) : 1963, 1968, 1970, 1971, 1972, 1973, 1974, 1975, 2000, 2009, 2012

References

External links
Official website 

Sport in Belgrade
Sports clubs established in 1945